Corsica Nazione was a Corsican nationalist party which aimed to gain control over Corsica from France, regain national rights, and promote the Corsican national identity. Corsica has been French since the Treaty of Versailles (1768) when they were annexed and claim to be repressed culturally, economically, and socially.

History 
The party , first received electoral recognition in 1992, when it received 20% of the votes for seats in the Corsican Assembly. Corsica requested state recognition from France in 1988, but was refused. France refuses to recognize the Corsican people as members of a Corsican state. Corsica Nazione is committed to furthering a peace process of negotiations with France, stating that the process will be "an end for good of political violence" as Corsica has a history of violent uprisings and suppressions. However, France has imposed unwanted trade unions upon Corsica, making it difficult for Corsica Nazione to further their goal to negotiate with France and secure peace. Besides an end to political violence, the nationalist party also aims to have native Corsicans from all over the world return to Corsica, where they will be given job placement preference. 

In 2004, the party leader Jean-Guy Talamoni joined with the leader of Unita Naziunale, Dr. Edmond Simeoni, to create a coalition between 9 nationalist parties in Corsica.

As of 2005, the Corsica Nazione must rely on its Assembly members, party affiliates, and human rights officials to push the party's issues into the realm of public awareness.

The party merged into Corsica Libera in 2009.

References 
 Home page
 General Information

Corsican nationalism
Political parties in Corsica
Nationalist parties in France
Separatism in France

Political parties established in 1992
Political parties disestablished in 2009